Viktoriia Kaliuzhna (born 11 July 1994) is a Ukrainian long-distance runner. She competed in women's marathon at the 2020 Summer Olympics, but did not finish.

References

External links 
 

 

1994 births
Living people
Ukrainian female long-distance runners
Ukrainian female marathon runners
Athletes (track and field) at the 2020 Summer Olympics
Olympic athletes of Ukraine